Liudvikas Saulius Razma (February 7, 1938 in Plateliai, Plungė – May 19, 2019) was a Lithuanian politician.  In 1990 he was among those who signed the Act of the Re-Establishment of the State of Lithuania.

References

1938 births
2019 deaths
People from Plungė
Lithuanian politicians